Bernard-Pierre Donnadieu (2 July 1949 – 27 December 2010) was a French actor.

He studied theater and film at the Sorbonne Paris III and began his career in film at the age of 25 by making appearances with acclaimed directors.  He notably appeared in The Tenant by Roman Polanski, The Professional by Georges Lautner, The Return of Martin Guerre by Daniel Vigne and The Vanishing by George Sluizer. He had appeared in more than 100 movies for the big screen and television.

Bernard-Pierre Donnadieu grew up with his sister, Agnes Donnadieu, a Chicago photographer, in Canada after their parents divorced while living in France. After the separation, the youngest brother, Philippe, moved with his mother to Australia where she remarried.  Pierre Donnadieu their father was also a great painter and sculptor unknown to the world.

Donnadieu died from cancer on 27 December 2010 at age 61. He left behind his daughter Ingrid Donnadieu, also an actress.

Partial filmography

 Docteur Françoise Gailland (1976)
 Monsieur Klein (1976) – Minor Role (uncredited)
 The Tenant (1976) – Bar Waiter
 If I Had to Do It All Over Again (1976) – Claude Blame
 Body of My Enemy (1976) – Le truand blond
 Mon premier amour (1978) – Patron de café
 Judith Therpauve (1978) – Laindreaux
 Coup de tête (1979) – Lucien
 Un si joli village (1979) – Arnoux
 Twice a Woman (1979) – 2nd Frenchman
 5% de risque (1980) – Le conducteur en colère
 Les Uns et les Autres (1981) – Le représentant Croix Rouge (UNICEF)
 The Professional (1981) – L'inspecteur Farges
 The Return of Martin Guerre (1982) – Martin Guerre
 L'indic (1983) – Malaggione
 Life Is a Bed of Roses (1983) – School Teacher
 Liberty Belle (1983) – Yvon
 The Death of Mario Ricci (1983) – Jacky Vermot
  (1984) – Mathias Hagen, dit 'Matt', le maître du quartier
  (1985) – Lucas Schroeder
 Among Wolves (1985) – De Saintes
 Max, Mon Amour (1986) – Archibald
 Flagrant désir (1986) – Robert Barnac
 L'intruse (1986) – Philippe Busard
 In the Shadow of the Wind (1987) – Pasteur Nicolas Jones
  (1987) – François / Béatrice's father
 The Vanishing (1988) – Raymond Lemorne
 Christian (1989)
 A Violent Life (1990) – François the First
 Connemara (1990) – Mark
 Marcellino (1991) – Il conte
 Blanc d'ébène (1991) – L'adjudant-recruteur Mariani
 Szwadron (1992) – Franek Bata
 Shadow of the Wolf (1992) – Brown
  (1993) – Dr. Friedmann
 Justinien Trouvé ou le Bâtard de Dieu (1993) – Martin Coutouly
 Mauvais garçon (1993) – Un inculpé
 Faut pas rire du bonheur (1994) – Michel
 Caboose (1996) – Larrivée
 Tower of the Firstborn (1998, TV Movie) – Abdurasam
 Druids (2001) – Dumnorix
 Antonio Vivaldi, un prince à Venise (2006) – L'ambassadeur de France
 Paris 36 (2008) – Galapiat
 Rose et Noir (2009) – Poveda (voice)

External links

1949 births
2010 deaths
Male actors from Paris
French male film actors
Deaths from cancer in France
Sorbonne Nouvelle University Paris 3 alumni